Robert Pollock (1709–1759) was a Church of Scotland minister who served as principal of Marischal College in Aberdeen from 1757 to 1759.

Life

He was born on 4 December 1707 in Edinburgh. He was educated at Edinburgh University graduating MA in May 1725. Trained as a Church of Scotland minister he was licensed by the Presbytery of Edinburgh in November 1732 but took several years to find a patron. He was ordained as minister of Duddingston Kirk just south of Edinburgh, in March 1744.

In July 1745 he translated to Greyfriars Church, Aberdeen. In August of the same year he took on the additional role of Professor of Divinity at Marischal College.

In May 1740 he took on the additional role as Almoner to the King (George II). In 1753 he was awarded a Doctor of Divinity. In April 1757 he succeeded Rev Dr Thomas Blackwell as Principal of Marishal College.

He died in Aberdeen on 18 May 1759 and is buried in the churchyard of the Kirk of St Nicholas. His position as principal was filled by Rev George Campbell.

Family

In 1747 he married Elizabeth Robertson (1727-1753) daughter of Alexander Robertson of Glasgowego, Provost of Aberdeen. They had several children:

Alexander Pollock (b.1748) surgeon in Aberdeen
Jane Pollock (1749-1840) married Alexander Duthie, advocate in Aberdeen
James 1751-1752
Margaret Pollock (1752-1831) married Alexander Dauney, advocate in Aberdeen
Walter (b.1753) - Elizabeth died at or soon after this birth

Artistic recognition

Joint portraits of Pollock and his wife (artist unknown) are held by Aberdeen University.

References
 

1709 births
1759 deaths
People from Edinburgh
Alumni of the University of Edinburgh
Academics of the University of Aberdeen
18th-century Ministers of the Church of Scotland